Oda or ODA may refer to:

Computing 
 Open Data Center Alliance, a cloud-computing standards organisation
 Open Design Alliance, a CAD-promoting group
 Optical Disc Archive, an archiving technology
 Open Document Architecture and interchange format, a file format
 Oracle Database Appliance, an Oracle Corporation engineered system

Government
 Organization Designation Authorization, FAA program for designating airworthiness authority
 Office of Detainee Affairs of the US Department of Defense
 Official development assistance, development aid provided by the member states of the Development Assistance Committee (DAC)
 Oklahoma Department of Agriculture, Food, and Forestry
 Ontarians with Disabilities Act, provincial legislation for disabled persons
 Oregon Department of Agriculture
 Oregon Department of Aviation
 Oregon Office of Degree Authorization
 Overseas Development Administration, predecessor to the United Kingdom's Department for International Development
Special forces, Operational Detachments-A

Organizations 
 Civic Democratic Alliance, a political party in the Czech Republic, functional 1989–2007
Civic Democratic Alliance (2016), the current political party in the Czech Republic.
 United Nations Office for Disarmament Affairs, United Nations Office for Disarmament Affairs
 Ohio Department of Agriculture
 Ohio Dental Association
 Olympic Delivery Authority, one of the two main agencies that organised the London Olympic Games
 Ontario Dental Association
 Organization for Democratic Action, alternate name for the Da'am Workers Party, a political party in Israel
 Overseas Development Administration, forerunner of the UK Department for International Development

People

Given name
 Oda, a Germanic female name with diminutive Odette   
 Oda of Canterbury (died 958), Archbishop of Canterbury from 942
 Saint Oda (680–726) of Scotland ( – ), a Dutch Roman Catholic saint supposedly of Scottish origin
 Oda of Meissen (c. 996 – aft. 1018), first Queen of Poland

Surname
 Oda (surname)
 Oda clan, a Japanese feudal clan from the Muromachi/Sengoku period

Places
 Ōda, Shimane, a city in Japan
 Oda, Ghana (disambiguation)

Others
 Only Dreamers Achieve, a record label created by Polo G
 Oda (Albania), typical Albanian room
 1144 Oda, an asteroid
 Oda, nickname for the Izh 2126, a compact hatchback automobile
 Out-of-Door Academy, school in Sarasota, Florida, United States
 Operational Detachment-Alpha, the standard 12-man team composed of US Army Special Forces operators
 Offline Data Authentication, a stage in EMV credit card payment authorization
 Oda Station (disambiguation)